Syed Shah Murshed Ali Alquadri Al Jilani, commonly known as “Maula Pak” and “Huzur Purnoor”, is one of the pioneers of Quaderia order in Bengal. He was the 19th direct descendant of Piran -i- Pir Dastagir Syedena Ghausul Azam.

Birth 
Syed Shah Murshed Ali Alquadri Al Jilani was born on Friday, the 27th of Ramadan, 1268 A.H /16 July 1852 AD at the Khanqah Sharif of Piyardanga, P.S Chandrakona, now West Midnapore. He was commonly known as “Huzur Purnoor” and “Maula Pak”. He was the eldest son and Sajjada nashin Syed Shah Mehr Ali Alquadri Al Baghdadi commonly known as “Aala Huzur”. His mother was Syeda Ummul Barkat Khatun Fatima Saniya. She was from the descendant of Syed Isa Rizvi, who came from Bukhara and settled at Payardanga in the district of Midnapore. Huzur Purnoor was born in the auspicious night of Shab-e- Qadar, (the night of Power). It is commonly believed that the Quran was revealed at this night.

Early life 
Huzur Purnoor would pass most of his early days in spiritual thought. Even in his childhood he showed his spiritual powers. There are numerous Keramat of Huzur Purnoor, only one is narrated here. When he was a child, a student named Sajjad Karim of the Madrasah which was attached to the Khanqah purposely disturbed Huzur Purnoor and did not allow him to write. Huzur Purnoor, annoyed, threw the inkpot of the boy into a well. At this the boy complained to the Maulvi of the Madrasah who on enquiry found the complaint to be true. The Maulvi said that Huzur should have complained to him instead of throwing the inkpot of a poor boy into the well. Huzur Purnoor then pointed to a niche and said that the ink pot was there. It was actually found there though all students had seen that it was thrown into the well.

Education 
Syedena Aala Huzur, the father of Huzur Purnoor, took upon himself the charge of education and spiritual training of his son. In order to accustom him to asceticism his father would often, at the dead of night, to make him go through the most difficult spiritual exercises. Huzur Purnoor was highly intelligent and possessed extraordinary memory. He got by heart his lessons by reading them only once and retained them throughout his life. At a very early age he mastered the commentaries of the Quran, Hadith, principles of Fiqah and Islamic Jurisprudence, Logic, and other subjects. He was the master of all branches of Knowledge. He had a great love for Hadith too. In his presence the difficult books of Hadith would often be recited. He had a large collection of books relating to the subject of Hadith.

Spiritual exercises 
Huzur Purnoor would offer five time prayers with great regularity and punctuality. Apart from this he spent most of his time in Nafal Ibadat, Moraqaba, Mushada, Dhikr and Wazifa. He observed fast throughout the year (except the days in which fast is forbidden). He would eat only a few morsels after midnight. He would count his string of beads throughout the day and night if not engaged in reciting the Quran or in contemplation or in other mode of prayers. For years he passed his life in the woods of “Gop” (a high woody place on the bank of river Kangsabati) in Midnapore and continued with his meditation, asceticism and abstinence. He passed far beyond the stage of Fanaa and attained the stage of Baqaa. Moreover he became Qutb of his time.

Journeys 
After spending a long time in jungle, Huzur Purnoor began to travel all over India for preaching Islam and guiding the Muslims, stopping at the shrines of the saints. In the beginning he would walk on foot, but later he would travel by train wherever there was railway. He toured frequently in the districts of Bengal. Apart from this he also visited Faridpur and Chittagong now in Bangladesh and many places in Bihar, Uttar Pradesh, Punjab and Rajasthan.

His Guidance 
Thousands of people from different parts of world, irrespective of caste, creed and religion received spiritual blessings from Huzur Purnoor and became his devoted disciple (Murid). At a stage almost the whole elite Muslim class of Bengal became his murid. Among his followers Khondokar Yusuf Ali, Bar at Law, father of Mr. H.N. Khondokar, Justice of Calcutta High Court, Shamsul Ulema Velayat Hussian, Head Maulvi, Calcutta Madrasah, Habibul Hassan, Assistant Inspector of Schools, Syed Shah Abdul Malik, Deputy Magistrate Deputy Collector, Khan Bahadur Abdul Ghaffar, Additional Chief Presidency Magistrate, Calcutta deserves special mention.

Family life 
Huzur Purnoor married twice. His first wife Syeda Salehatunnesa better known as Subah Bibi was from the family of a great saint of Bengal Syedena Ruhullah Al Hussaini who was the descendant of Imam Hussian. His second wife Syeda Najmunnesa Khatun was the daughter of Hafiz Syed Fateh Ali of Arrah in Bihar. Huzur Purnoor had four sons and two daughters. His first wife bore him three son i.e Syed Shah Arshad Ali Alquadri, Syed Shah Irshad Ali Alquadri, who was his spiritual successor (Sajjadanashin), Syed Shah Rashed Ali Alquadri, and a daughter Syeda Amatul Fatma. His second wife bore him one daughter Syeda Saghira Khatun and a son Syed Shah Khurshid Ali Alquadri.

Death 
Huzur Purnoor's death took place on 27th of Shawal, 1318 A.H, corresponding to 17 February 1901 AD and 4th Falgun 1307 B.S. The prayer of Janazah was led by famous Islamic scholar Maulana Khairuddin Sahab, father of Maulana Abul Kalam Azad. It was in accordance with the wish of Huzur Purnoor. It so happened that during those days Maulana Khairuddin was staying in Mumbai and was very sick. At this stage one night he dreamt Huzur Purnoor, who was calling him for leading his Janazah prayer. The very next day Maulana set out for Calcutta by train, after arriving he got the news of Huzur Purnoor s’ demise. He hurried to the Khanqah Sharif and led the congregation of Janazah prayer.

Huzur Purnoor was buried in the family burial ground at Mia Mohallah in Midnapore Town. There is also a mosque attached to the Shrine. It is known as Jora Masjid to the local people. The Urs Sharif (Death Anniversary) of this great saint is celebrated every year with great pomp and grandeur in Midnapore. In this connection a big Mela or Fair known as Mina Bazar Mela is also held near the holy shrine. A special train also runs from Bangladesh to Midnapore on this occasion.

Works 
Huzur Purnoor was an eminent writer and a unique Sufi poet. He composed a diwan namely “Diwan-i-Hazrat-i-Jamal” which has been published many times. This Diwan is abundantly read throughout the sub continent. It contains Ghazals (odes) in Urdu. His nom-de-plume was Aasi and Jamal. The diwan is deeply religious in thought and inspired by the spirit of Islamic mysticism. In prose his master piece work is Toghra -i- Mahamed written in simple Persian on the life and achievements of Syedena Aala Huzur. Besides, he wrote many valuable treatises on Sufism. His letters are also good example of his literary scholarship.

Footnotes 

Dargahs in India